Katherine Victoria O'Regan  (née Newton, 24 May 1946 – 2 May 2018) was a New Zealand politician. She was a  member of parliament from 1984 to 1999, representing the National Party. She served as a minister for the National Government for six of those years.

Early life
Katherine Victoria Newton was born to farming parents at Te Mata, on the West Coast of the North Island and attended Hamilton Girls' High School. She chose a nursing career but left after two years due to suffering from back problems. After leaving nursing, O'Regan was involved in community organisations like the Plunket Society, SPELD (a non-profit organisation that supports people with dyslexia) and the Hamilton Speech Therapy Association.

Political career

O'Regan was a voting delegate for the National Party in the Raglan electorate candidate selection ahead of the 1975 election, where she supported Marilyn Waring. O'Regan would work for Waring as her electoral agent for eight years. She was elected to the Waipa County Council in 1977 and served as a county councillor for eight years; she was the first woman to be elected to the council. When Waring, then representing the Waipa electorate, retired from Parliament, O'Regan was selected as the new National Party candidate for the electorate in 1984. She held Waipa for twelve years until it was abolished in 1996.

In Opposition, 1984–1990 
The National Government was defeated at the 1984 election. On her entry to Parliament, O'Regan sought to highlight the plight of children with specific learning disabilities by introducing a private members bill seeking recognition by the education system of children with these disabilities. It was not successful, but the bill was carried over by the Labour Party in Government. It was finally discharged after 1990.

In Government, 1990–1999 
National regained the government benches in 1990. In the Fourth National Government, O'Regan was appointed as a Minister outside of Cabinet, as Minister of Consumer Affairs, Associate Minister of Health, Associate Minister of Social Welfare and Associate Minister of Women's Affairs. These remained her portfolios until the 1996 election; she additionally served as Minister of Youth Affairs in 1996. As Associate Minister of Health, she amended the Human Rights Act to outlaw discrimination on the grounds of sexual orientation and having organisms in the body which might cause disease and established a free breast cancer screening programme.

In 1993, O'Regan was awarded the New Zealand Suffrage Centennial Medal. In 1994, O'Regan led the New Zealand Delegation to the United Nations Population and Development Conference in Cairo and also gave the Second Country Report to CEDAW at the United Nations in New York.

Ahead of the 1996 general election, the Waipa electorate was disestablished. O'Regan contested the Tauranga electorate against the former National Party MP for Tauranga, Winston Peters, who was contesting the electorate under his New Zealand First Party. O'Regan was unsuccessful in this election but remained in Parliament as a list MP. With the National Party forming a coalition government with New Zealand First, O'Regan did not continue in Cabinet and was instead appointed the Chairperson of the Internal Affairs select committee from 1996 to 1999. O'Regan continued her interest in population and development issues by establishing, with the help of Family Planning International, a New Zealand Parliamentarians' Group on Population and Development.

In the 1999 general election, she again challenged Peters, and came within 62 votes of defeating him—had she won, the New Zealand First party would have lost all parliamentary representation. Labour's candidate Margaret Wilson, who came third in the electorate, requested a recount. The final result was a 63 votes majority for Peters. O'Regan attempted to oust Peters from the electorate by encouraging voters to vote tactically, and vote for her rather than Labour's Wilson. However, Peters was re-elected but with a much reduced margin. Unlike in 1996, O'Regan was not high enough on National's party list to remain in Parliament and thus retired from politics.

Later career 
In the 2002 Queen's Birthday and Golden Jubilee Honours, O'Regan was appointed a Companion of the Queen's Service Order for public services.

She was the chair of the Te Awamutu Community Public Relations Organisation. She was Chair of the Human Ethics in Research Committee for eight years at Waikato Institute of Technology and served on the New Zealand Law Society Waikato/Bay of Plenty Complaints Committee.

Political views
O'Regan was a council member of Family Planning New Zealand. She favoured compulsory sex education from age ten and condom vending machines in all secondary schools and public toilets. In an obituary, her daughter Susan O'Regan described her mother as a Royalist, feminist, and strong believer in equal rights.

Personal life 
O'Regan has two children to her first husband Neil O'Regan, whom she married in 1968. The couple divorced; O'Regan married former National MP Michael Cox in 1992.

O'Regan was diagnosed, through the free screening programme she had established as Associate Minister of Health, with breast cancer in 2008. She died of her illness on 2 May 2018.

References

Further reading 

 O'Regan, Katherine. The Thread is Politics. In Clark, Margaret (ed). (1986) Beyond Expectations: fourteen New Zealand women write about their lives. Allen & Unwin. p. 143–154.

1946 births
2018 deaths
Companions of the Queen's Service Order
Members of the New Zealand House of Representatives
New Zealand list MPs
New Zealand MPs for North Island electorates
New Zealand National Party MPs
Unsuccessful candidates in the 1999 New Zealand general election
Women members of the New Zealand House of Representatives
People educated at Hamilton Girls' High School
21st-century New Zealand politicians
21st-century New Zealand women politicians
Deaths from breast cancer
Deaths from cancer in New Zealand
People from Waikato
Recipients of the New Zealand Suffrage Centennial Medal 1993
New Zealand justices of the peace
New Zealand feminists